A color wheel or other switch for changing a projected hue (e.g., for an optical display) is a device that uses different optics filters or color gels within a light beam.  Common usage includes continuously-rotating wheels for seasonal home displays (e.g., at Christmas) and controllable color wheels for a particular instrument (e.g., SeaChanger Color Engine for stage lighting), while non-wheel devices include scrollers and semaphore types with lever arms (e.g., on the 1897-1917 Grand Army Plaza fountain).

References

External links

Mechanisms (engineering)
Optical filters